Wells Fargo Advisors is a subsidiary of Wells Fargo, located in St Louis, Missouri. It is the third largest brokerage firm in the United States as of June 30, 2021 with $1.9 trillion retail client assets under management.

The subsidiary was formerly known as Wachovia Securities until May 1, 2009, when it legally changed names following Wells Fargo's acquisition of Wachovia Corporation.

History
Wells Fargo Advisors traces its history to 1879, where it grew through mergers with many of the industry's regional and national firms. These include Wachovia Securities, A. G. Edwards, and Bache & Co.
The current President is Sol Gindi.

References

External links
 Wells Fargo Advisors

Financial services companies of the United States
Companies based in St. Louis
Financial services companies established in 1879
1879 establishments in Missouri
American companies established in 1879